Necrospermia (or necrozoospermia) [Shukra Dosha in Hindi or Sanskrit] is a condition in which there is a low percentage of live and a very high percentage of immotile spermatozoa in semen.

Necrospermia is usually confused with asthenozoospermia, which is the inability of the sperm to move even when alive. To check for necrospermia, samples with a high percentage of immobile sperm are stained to check for vitality. If they are dead sperm they will be stained, as the membrane is broken and the dye enters indiscriminately. Necrozoospermia is a rare condition with a reported prevalence of 0.2–0.48% in infertile subjects.

Treatment in complementary and alternative medicine 
It has been claimed that necrospermia can be successfully treated in Ayurveda. A single case report to that effect has been published.

References

Testicular infertility factors